Marie-Louise Castenskiold (born 10 November 1960) is a Danish equestrian. She competed in two events at the 1984 Summer Olympics.

References

External links
 

1960 births
Living people
Danish female equestrians
Danish dressage riders
Olympic equestrians of Denmark
Equestrians at the 1984 Summer Olympics
People from Holbæk Municipality
Sportspeople from Region Zealand